Christian Anthony Burns (born 18 January 1974) is an English singer. He is the son of Tony Burns of The Signs, a Liverpool-based rock band signed to Decca Records in the 1960s.

Career 

Burns was a member of the popular British band BBMak, along with Mark Barry and Stephen McNally. The group sold nearly three million albums worldwide and had a top 5 single with "Back Here", in the UK.  In the United States, "Back Here" reached #13 on the Hot 100 and received heavy video play on MTV and TRL.

In 2003, the band broke up, and all the members went on to pursue solo careers.
Since then Burns has been collaborating with other artists and dance projects. In 2007, he worked with Tiësto on the track "In the Dark", for the album Elements of Life.  He collaborated with Tiësto again on the track entitled "Power of You", where Tiësto used the alias Allure.

He has also collaborated with Benny Benassi, on the song "Love and Motion", and American singer Jes Brieden on the song "As We Collide".

He is featured heavily on electronic musician BT's 2010 album These Hopeful Machines, co-writing the songs "Suddenly", "The Emergency", and "Forget Me".  He provides lead vocals on "Suddenly" and backing vocals on "The Emergency" and "Forget Me".

He also collaborated with Richard Durand on  "Night & Day", and with Armin van Buuren on "This Light Between Us", taken from his album Mirage. Other collaborations include tracks by Matt Darey, Sebastian Ingrosso, and Dirty South.

Burns' debut solo album is called Simple Modern Answers and was released on 25 October 2013.

In 2012, Burns began a collaboration with BT on a single entitled All Hail the Silence, eventually leading to a full studio album initially set for release in the late summer or fall of 2012, but was postponed until after both are done with their solo albums. All Hail the Silence and the subsequent album are notable in that they were created using analog synthesizers without the aid of a computer. On 21 July 2014, Transeau and Burns announced that their band would be touring with Erasure in the fall of 2014 for the album The Violet Flame. On 24 August 2016 the band announced that they would release a limited edition colored 12" vinyl collectible extended play entitled AHTS-001 with Shopify on 19 September 2016. On 28 September 2018 the band released their first official single, "Diamonds in the Snow", along with its accompanying music video. The band's first album, Daggers, was released on 18 January 2019.

In 2016, Burns, instrumentalist Jonathan Radford Mead and drummer Ash Soan formed a band called The Blind Love. Their first song, "Without You", was released and premiered on the episode "Coming Home Was a Mistake" on the television series The Vampire Diaries. Their next song, "Run (Where the Lights Are)", premiered on 30 November 2016 on the episode "Interference" for the television series Frequency. A third song, "Wild Horses", was released on 2 April 2018. Their first extended play was released on 14 May 2018. The second extended play was released on 13 August 2018. The band released two new singles in 2020 – "The Long Way Home" and "Surrender".

In 2018, Burns and songwriter/producer Steve Chrisanthou formed a duo called Fear The Hopeful, and released an EP called "Wait For Love".

Burns recently reunited with members Barry and McNally for a tour and a new BBMak album, Powerstation, the same year. Burns also announced a solo album to be released by Black Hole Recordings in 2019. That album ended up being Love Songs from Suburbia, which was set for release on 4 June. The album hit #1 on the iTunes US dance album chart shortly after release.

Discography 

 For the Christian Burns discography with BBMak, see BBMak discography.
 For the Christian Burns discography with All Hail the Silence, see All Hail the Silence discography.

Albums

Solo 
 Simple Modern Answers (2013)
 Love Songs from Suburbia (2021)

Singles 
As lead artist

As featured artist

Other appearances 

The Bleachworks
12 October 2009 – "Gravity"
4 March 2010 – "Breakdown" (free download)
9 September 2010 – "Save This City" (as Phonic Funk featuring The Bleachworks)
11 April 2011 – "It's Ok" (as Jason Herd featuring The Bleachworks)

Soundtracks
30 December 2005 – Sky High – "Everybody Wants to Rule the World"
21 November 2006 – Little Athens – "Tranquilized" (Inhaler featuring Christian Burns)

References

External links 

1974 births
BBMak members
English male singers
English pop rock singers
Living people
Singers from Liverpool
Trance singers
21st-century British male singers